Church of St. Thérèse of Lisieux may refer to:

 Cathedral of Saint Theresa of Lisieux, Hamilton, Bermuda
 Basilica of St Therese of the Child Jesus, Cairo, Egypt
 Sainte-Thérèse-de-l'Enfant-Jésus, Hirson, Aisne, France
 Basilica of Sainte-Thérèse, Lisieux, France
 St. Therese of Infant Jesus Church, Kandanvilai, India
 St. Theresa of Lisieux Catholic Church, Vellayambalam, Trivandrum, India
 Saint Therese of the Child Jesus Parish Church, University of the Philippines Los Baños
 Shrine of St. Therese, Doctor of the Church, Villamor Air Base (Nichols), Pasay, Philippines
 St. Térèse Church, Ankara, Turkey
 St. Therese of Lisieux Church (Louisville, Kentucky), United States
 Virgen del Carmen y Santa Teresita, Montevideo, Uruguay

See also
 List of places named after Saint Thérèse of Lisieux
 Saint Therese (disambiguation)
 Saint Teresa (disambiguation)
 Santa Teresa (disambiguation)
 St. Theresa's Cathedral (disambiguation)
 St. Theresa Church (disambiguation)